Bohdan Vasyliovych Rebryk (30 July 1938 – 1 January 2023) was a Ukrainian politician. A member of the Ukrainian Republican Party, he served in the Verkhovna Rada from 1990 to 1994.

Rebryk died in Ivano-Frankivsk on 1 January 2023, at the age of 84.

References

1938 births
2023 deaths
Ukrainian Republican Party politicians
First convocation members of the Verkhovna Rada
Chevaliers of the Order For Courage, 1st class
Recipients of the Order of Merit (Ukraine), 3rd class
Laureates of the Honorary Diploma of the Verkhovna Rada of Ukraine
People from Stanisławów Voivodeship
Soviet dissidents
Ukrainian dissidents
Ukrainian Helsinki Group